Bekir Büyükarkın (1921 – 7 August 1998) was a Turkish poet, novelist and playwright. He graduated from Istanbul Vefa High School in 1939 and from the Istanbul University School of Economics and Administrative Sciences in 1942.

Büyükarkın worked at Türk Ticaret Bankası as a freelance accountant. Known for his novels and plays, he also wrote two unpublished poetry books. His play, Dökmeci, won the competition for stage plays organized by CHP in 1947.

Writings

Poetry 

 Eski Dost (1959)
 Rüzgâr (1965)

Novels 

 Cadıların Kırbacı (1946)
 Maske (1955)
 Bir Sel Gibi (1962)
 Son Akın (1963)
 Belki Bir Gün (1965)
 Suların Gölgesinde (1966)
 Bozkırda Sabah (1969)
 Tanyeri (1967)
 Kutlu Dağ

Theatre 

 Dökmeci (1954),
 Yarısı (1967)
 Üç Oyun (Armutlar - Yolcular - Tanyeri / 1970)
 Duman (1970)
 İki Oyun (Duman - Keçiler / 1970)
 Soytarı (1974)

See also 

 List of composers of classical Turkish music

References 

Turkish novelists
Turkish poets
Turkish dramatists and playwrights
Composers of Ottoman classical music
Composers of Turkish makam music
1921 births
1998 deaths
20th-century novelists
20th-century poets
20th-century dramatists and playwrights